Wilfred Paulin Nichol (29 May 1901 – 8 February 1955) was an English sprinter who competed at the 1924 Summer Olympics. He won a silver medal in the  relay, together with Harold Abrahams, Walter Rangeley and Lancelot Royle, but failed to reach the finals of the individual 100 m and 200 m events. Nichol placed second-third in the 100 yd and 220 yd events at the Amateur Athletic Association of England (AAA) championships of 1923–24. In the 1923 100 yd final he was second to Eric Liddell, who set a new British record at 9.7 seconds. In 1926 Nichol became the first Honorary Secretary on the formation of Nottinghamshire AAA.

References

1901 births
1955 deaths
British male sprinters
English male sprinters
Athletes (track and field) at the 1924 Summer Olympics
Olympic athletes of Great Britain
Olympic silver medallists for Great Britain
Sportspeople from Newcastle upon Tyne
Medalists at the 1924 Summer Olympics
Olympic silver medalists in athletics (track and field)